The Veteran is a short story collection by British author Frederick Forsyth. The book was first published on 8 September 2001, through Thomas Dunne Books and includes five of Forsyth's short stories. This is the second short story collection by the author, following the release of his 1982 collection, No Comebacks.

Stories
"The Veteran (short story)"
An unidentified elderly man is kicked half to death by a pair of thugs in London in a mugging gone wrong (when he resists and injures them badly). The police identify and apprehend the pair. By then the elderly man has succumbed to his injuries in hospital, but with the evidence and testimony available, the prosecution is certain of life imprisonment for the 2 criminals.

But they are acquitted when one of the best attorneys of the UK approaches the court and becomes their pro-bono counsellor for no apparent reason, winning the case.
Cryptically, after the judgement has been read out, the attorney ignores his 2 clients and shakes the hand of the lead detective, who angrily brushes it off, and tells him that, that even though he may not believe it, "today, Justice has won", before rushing out of the courtroom.

Soon after the dismissal of the case, the detectives identify the dead man as a former SAS / BATT trooper who served in "The Battle of Mirbat", Oman.
Shockingly, they discover that the very same lawyer who argued and won the dismissal of the two thugs was the commanding officer of the dead man in that same battle, together fending off an attack of 300-400 men and forming a tight-knit bond for life, among the soldiers and officer.

Realisation dawns on the detectives and soon, they realise the 2 thugs would now meet a fate worse than life imprisonment. And sure enough, a few weeks later, the bodies of the two men are found at the bottom of a lake, strangled by piano wire - in a case that is eventually closed as "unsolved".

"The Art of the Matter"
"The Miracle"
"The Citizen"
"Whispering Wind"

Publication
The stories were originally published individually online by the company Online Originals under the collective title Quintet, before being collected into a single volume as The Veteran.

Reception
Critical reception has been mixed. The Guardian panned The Veteran, writing "Paper-thin plots and cardboard characters from the self-styled world's greatest storyteller". Christopher Petit reckoned Forsyth was a relic of bygone times, calling it "polished and moribund as a joke at an after-dinner speech, with a ponderous twist, a punchline and a little moral to tie it all up". The BBC was mixed, stating that "This collection is tautly written and practically boasts of the deep level of research that underpins it. But the storytelling itself has mixed results - perhaps too mixed to convince a first-time reader of Forsyth's reputation as the thriller writer's thriller writer."

The Daily Telegraph was more positive in their review, as they felt that Forsyth had fun writing the work and that while some of the stories were weaker than the others, they were all "highly readable".

References

2001 short story collections
Short story collections by Frederick Forsyth
Thriller short story collections
Thomas Dunne Books books